Philip Douglas  Lawley (4 July 1927 – 18 December 2011 ) was a British chemist, best known for demonstrating that DNA damage was the base cause of cancer working with Peter Brookes. In January 2003 the ICR honoured the achievements of Brookes and Lawley by naming a £21m laboratory after them. It is devoted to research on the genetic nature of cancer and located next to the Haddow laboratories.

References

British chemists
1927 births
2011 deaths
Alumni of the University of Oxford
British biochemists
Academics of the Institute of Cancer Research
People from Abbots Bromley